The Wan Chai District Council is the district council for the Wan Chai District in Hong Kong. It is one of 18 such councils. The Wan Chai District Council currently consists of 13 members, of which the district is divided into 13 constituencies, electing a total of 13 members. The latest election was held on 24 November 2019.

History
The Wan Chai District Council was established on 20 February 1982 under the name of the Wan Chai District Board as the result of the colonial Governor Murray MacLehose's District Administration Scheme reform. The District Board was partly elected with the ex-officio Urban Council members, as well as members appointed by the Governor until 1994 when last Governor Chris Patten refrained from appointing any member.

The Wan Chai District Board became Wan Chai Provisional District Board after the Hong Kong Special Administrative Region (HKSAR) was established in 1997 with the appointment system being reintroduced by Chief Executive Tung Chee-hwa. The Wan Chai District Council was established on 1 January 2000 after the first District Council election in 1999. The council has become fully elected when the appointed seats were abolished in 2011 after the modified constitutional reform proposal was passed by the Legislative Council in 2010.

The Wan Chai District Council is the smallest District Council, having only 13 members due to its small population. Due to its continuing shrinking in size, the government in 2015 decided to transfer Tin Hau and Victoria Park constituencies from the Eastern District Council to Wan Chai.

The Wan Chai District Council has been controlled by the conservatives with Peggy Lam being the chairwoman of the council from 1985 to 2003. The conservative control was interrupted between 2003 and 2007, when the pro-democrats and their allies took advance of the anti-government sentiment of the 2003 July 1 march in which the newly established Civic Act-up under Legislative Councillor Cyd Ho became the largest party in the council in the 2003 election and make nonpartisan Ada Wong Ying-kay the council chairwoman. The pro-democracy council was noted for its community reforms, stressing the citizens' involvement in the community planning, such as the urban renewal projects including the controversy over the demolition of Lee Tung Street. The pro-democracy council lasted for one term until the Democratic Alliance for the Betterment and Progress of Hong Kong (DAB) retook its largest party status in the 2007 election while Civic Act-up lost all their seats.

The 2019–20 pro-democracy protests brought a historic landslide victory to the pro-democrats in the November election with members of the local political group Kickstart Wan Chai who all ran as independents won numbers of seats, ousting long-time pro-Beijing incumbents and took control of the council for the first time since 2003 election.

Political control
Since 1982 political control of the council has been held by the following parties:

Political makeup

Elections are held every four years.

District result maps

Members represented
Starting from 1 January 2020:

Leadership

Chairs
Since 1985, the chairman is elected by all the members of the board:

Vice Chairs

Notes

References

External links
 http://www.districtcouncils.gov.hk/wc/english/welcome.htm

 
Districts of Hong Kong
Wan Chai District